Faustabryna is a genus of longhorn beetles of the subfamily Lamiinae, containing the following species:

 Faustabryna fausta (Newman, 1842)
 Faustabryna metallica (Breuning, 1938)
 Faustabryna mindanaoensis (Breuning, 1980)
 Faustabryna vivesi (Breuning, 1981)
 Faustabryna celebiana Vives, 2014
 Faustabryna multialboguttata (Breuning, 1960)
 Faustabryna affinis Vives, 2014

References

Pteropliini